Zhu Xun (born 7 September 1973) is a Chinese television host.

Biography 
Born in Beijing, Zhu began her career as a television host in 1987, when she was a teenager. She was the host of the Our Generation program. In 1988 she appeared in the film Rocking Youth. In 1992 she paused her television work to go to university at Asia University in Japan, studying management. Thereafter she remained in Japan and became a host with Japanese television station NHK. She then appeared in the television show Bounce Ko Gals, Three Giant Dragons, and Shanghainese in Tokyo. In 1998 she wrote her MBA thesis on "Media Market Strategy in the 21st Century". She later returned to China. She has hosted the 2009, 2011, 2015, and 2016 editions of the CCTV New Year's Gala.

She is married to Wang Zhi, another television presenter who works for CCTV.

As with most non-locals, Zhu Xun once pronounced the name of Luhe District, Nanjing as Liuhe instead of Luhe.

References

1973 births
Living people
People from Beijing
Asia University (Japan) alumni
Hosts of the CCTV New Year's Gala
CCTV television presenters